Karishika is a 1996 Nigerian horror film starring Becky Okorie.

Plot
A man waits outside a hospital's delivery room, minutes later a nurse comes out to tell him that his wife gave birth to a yam tuber. He immediately leaves the hospital in anger. This would lead to a fall out between him and his wife upon her discharge from the hospital. Following a heated argument, she hits him with a pestle and he falls to the ground dead. Karashika appears and asks her to hang herself, which she did, and she is taken to hell by Karashika.

A boy called Divine in church rises to read John 3:16 to the hearing of the congregation and the pastor (Joseph Okechukwu) preaches about the sacrifice of God and points out an model Christian family of which Divine is the only child.

Lucifer begins preparations to send out agents who will cause more people to sin and hence increase the population of hell.
They arrive on Earth, in Lagos, Nigeria. They are greeted by a set of demonic spirit mediums.
They lodge in a hotel, paid for with money that appeared out of thin air. While the demons were having a meeting the hotel receptionist stood outside the door, spying on the demons through the keyhole. One of them disappears and appears behind the receptionist. The demons abducts Divine, he would later come home behaving differently. The demons make a scene at a bar which results in a shoot-out.
They would also recruit a human bank manager to work with them, and a magician, meeting him backstage after his magic show.

Back in "hell" Lucifer burns one of his subject for disobedience as a warning to others.

Back on Earth, a man is run over by a car because he was distracted by one of the female demons. The demonic spirit in Divine is aroused. The demons goes out to local bars to pick up victims. The victims are killed and their souls are taken to hell.

Divine's father rebukes Divine for stealing his money, Divine's mother defends him.

The pastor is tempted by one of the female demons, God makes a bet with the devil concerning the pastor's devotion to him. The pastor passes the test but only just barely.

Divine's mother wakes up from a bad dream, Divine's father calms her down and they go back to sleep but then Divine's father has a nightmare. The pastor comes to Divine's home and exorcises him. All the demons appear out of thin air and engages him in battle. God takes away Lucifer's power to harm the pastor, he gives the pastor victory and unleashes his wrath on the devil.

Cast
Becky Okorie as Karishika
Bob-Manuel Udokwu as Pastor Evarist
Sandra Achums as Bianca
Ifeanyi Ikpoenyi as Pastor James/Rakadana
Obi Madubogwu as Lucifer
Andy Chukwu as Elder Bobby/Barashi
Steve Eboh as Church member
Sonny McDon as Elder Desmond
Adaora Ukoh as Esther         
Amaechi Muonagor as Jonathan
Joseph Okechukwu as Pastor

References

Nigerian horror films
1996 films
1990s English-language films
Films shot in Nigeria
English-language Nigerian films